The 2017–18 Burger King Super Smash (named after the competition's sponsor Burger King) was the thirteenth season of the Men's Super Smash Twenty20 cricket tournament in New Zealand. The competition was run from 13 December 2017 to 20 January 2018. The Wellington Firebirds were the defending champions.

Following the completion of the round-robin fixtures, Northern Knights, Auckland Aces and Central Stags had qualified for the finals of the competition. Northern Knights  won the tournament after they beat Central Stags by nine wickets in the final.

Points table

 Team qualified for the finals

Fixtures

Round-robin

Finals

References

External links
 Series home at ESPN Cricinfo

2017–18 New Zealand cricket season
Super Smash
Super Smash (cricket)